Robert Lalthlamuana is a retired Indian football player who had formerly played in left-back position for NorthEast United.

Career

Churchill Brothers
After graduating from the Tata Football Academy, Robert started his footballing career with I-League club Churchill Brothers in 2008. He would go on to have a successful time at the Goan clubs, winning the I-League in 2008-09 season and the Durand Cup in 2009.

East Bengal
In June 2011, Robert signed with East Bengal of Kolkata. Robert was an important part of the East Bengal squad that won the Federation Cup in 2012 and the IFA shield in 2012.

Robert represented Delhi Dynamos FC of the Indian Super League on loan from East Bengal for the 2014 edition. 
In June 2015, Delhi Dynamos retained him for next season ISL along with 4 more players.

NorthEast United
On 23 July 2017, NorthEast United has signed Robert as their fourth pick in 2017–18 ISL Players Draft. He captained his team in the first match of the season against Jamshedpur.

International
After a good season at Churchill Brothers, Robert was called up to the India national football team preparatory camp in June and made his debut against Maldives on 10 July 2011 coming off the bench.

Career statistics

Honours

India U23
SAFF Championship: 2009

References

 http://www.goal.com/en-india/people/india/21127/robert-lalthlamuana

1989 births
Living people
Indian footballers
India international footballers
India youth international footballers
Churchill Brothers FC Goa players
I-League players
Indian Super League players
East Bengal Club players
Odisha FC players
Footballers from Mizoram
Association football defenders
Footballers at the 2010 Asian Games
Asian Games competitors for India